Alles Bob (All About Bob) is a 1999 German film starring , Martina Gedeck and Miriam Lahnstein, directed by .

The film, is about a young man who tells women what they want to hear to get sex.

External links
 

1999 films
1999 comedy films
German comedy films
1990s German films
1990s German-language films